De la Rue, De La Rue or Delarue is a surname of French origin meaning "of the Street". Notable people with the surname include:

Charles de la Rue (1643–1725), noted orator of the Society of Jesus in France, poet and professor
Edgar Aubert de la Rüe (1901–1991), French geographer, geologist, traveller and photographer 
Gervais de La Rue (1751–1835), French historical investigator, once regarded as an authorities on Norman and Anglo-Norman literature
Hippolyte De La Rue (1891–1977), Royal Australian Air Force air commodore
Jean-Luc Delarue (1964–2012), French French television presenter and producer
Lucie Delarue-Mardrus (1874–1945), French journalist, poet, novelist, sculptor, historian and designer
Maurice Delarue (1919–2013), French journalist
Paul-Henri de Le Rue (born 1984), French snowboarder, 2006 Olympic bronze medalist
Pierre de la Rue (c. 1452–1518), Franco-Flemish composer and singer
Thomas de la Rue (1793–1866), printer from Guernsey 
Warren De la Rue (1815–1889), British astronomer and chemist
De La Rue baronets, various baronets with the surname

See also
LaRue, surname
de la Rúa (surname), includes a list of people with the name
 De Le Rue

French-language surnames